Sir Richard Parsons  (b. Marylebone 14 March 1928 – 23 April 2016) was a  British diplomat who was ambassador to Hungary, Spain and Sweden, and a novelist, playwright and (under a pseudonym) crime writer.

Career
Richard Edmund Clement Fownes Parsons was educated at Bembridge School and Brasenose College, Oxford. He served in the British Army 1949–51, then joined the Diplomatic Service. Between posts at the Foreign Office (later the Foreign and Commonwealth Office) he served at the embassies in Washington, D.C., Vientiane, Buenos Aires, Ankara and Lagos. He was ambassador to Hungary 1976–79, to Spain 1980–84, and to Sweden 1984–87. He was appointed CMG while in Hungary and knighted KCMG during his posting to Spain.

He died on 23 April 2016 at the age of 88.

Publications
The Moon Pool, Mandarin, 1990. 
Rialto : Mortmain : Dead end : three plays, Samuel French, 1993. 
The Den of the Basilisk, Melrose Books, 2012. 
Howling at the Moon, Melrose Books, 2013. 
As John Haythorne:
None of Us Cared for Kate, Cassell, 1968. 
The Strelsau dimension, Quartet, 1981. 
Mandrake in Granada, Ross Anderson, Bolton, 1984. 
Mandrake in the monastery, Ross Anderson, Bolton, 1985.

References
PARSONS, Sir Richard (Edmund Clement Fownes), Who's Who 2013, A & C Black, 2013; online edn, Oxford University Press, Dec 2012

1928 births
2016 deaths
People educated at Bembridge School
Alumni of Brasenose College, Oxford
Ambassadors of the United Kingdom to Hungary
Ambassadors of the United Kingdom to Spain
Ambassadors of the United Kingdom to Sweden
Knights Commander of the Order of St Michael and St George
British crime writers
British dramatists and playwrights
British male dramatists and playwrights